Agathos Daimon originally was a lesser deity (daemon) of classical ancient Greek religion and Graeco-Egyptian religion. In his original Greek form, he served as a household god, to whom, along with Zeus Soter, libations were made after a meal. In later (post-)Ptolemaic antiquity he took on two partially distinct roles; one as the Agathos Daimon a prominent serpentine civic god, who served as the special protector of Alexandria. The other as a genus of serpentine household gods, the Agathoi Daimones, individual protectors of the homes in which they were worshipped.

Greek classical period
Though little noted in Greek mythology (Pausanias conjectured that the name was merely an epithet of Zeus), he was prominent in Greek folk religion; it was customary to drink or pour out a few drops of unmixed wine after the meal to honor him and Zeus after every symposium or formal banquet, as was done for Hestia prior to the meal. In Aristophanes' Peace, when War has trapped Peace (Εἰρήνη Eirene) in a deep pit, Hermes comes to give aid: "Now, oh Greeks! is the moment when, freed of quarrels and fighting, we should rescue sweet Eirene and draw her out of this pit... This is the moment to drain a cup in honor of the Agathos Daimon."  A temple dedicated to them was situated on the road from Megalopolis to Maenalus in Arcadia.

Agathos Daimon was the spouse or companion of Tyche Agathe ("Good Fortune"). "Tyche we know at Lebadeia as the wife of the Agathos Daimon, the Good or Rich Spirit".  Their numinous presence could be represented in art as a serpent or more concretely as a young man bearing a cornucopia and a bowl in one hand, and a poppy and an ear of grain in the other.

Egyptian late antiquity
In the syncretic atmosphere of late Antiquity, agathodaemons could be bound up with Egyptian bringers of security and good fortune: a gem carved with magic emblems bears the images of Serapis with crocodile, sun-lion and Osiris mummy surrounded by the lion-headed snake Chnum–Agathodaemon–Aion, with Harpocrates on the reverse.

See also
Cacodaemon
Eudaemon
Genius

Footnotes

References

Bibliography

External links

Theoi.com: Greek and Latin sources in translation

Agricultural gods
Greek gods
Health gods
Fortune gods
Wisdom gods
Legendary serpents
Epithets of Zeus
Religion in ancient Arcadia
Hellenistic deities
Tutelary deities
Household deities
Daimons